What If is a studio album by American musician Jerry Douglas. It was released in August 2017 under Rounder Records.

Track listing

Charts

Awards

References

2017 albums
Rounder Records albums